Venafrum was an ancient town of Molise, Italy, close to the boundaries of both Latium adiectum and Samnium.

Overview
Venafrum was established as a civitas sine suffragio in 201 BC. Ancient authors tell us but little about it, except that it was one of those towns governed by a prefect sent yearly from Rome, and that in the Social War it was taken by the allies by treachery. Augustus founded a colony there and provided for the construction of an aqueduct (cf. the long decree relating to it in Corp. Inscr. Lat. x. No. 4842).

It seems to have been a place of some importance. Its olive oil was the best in Italy, and Cato mentions its brickworks and iron manufactures. The original line of the Via Latina probably ran through Venafrum, making a detour, which the later road seems to have avoided. Rufrae was probably dependent on it. Roads also ran from Venafrum to Isernia and to Telesia by way of Allifae.

References

External links

Roman towns and cities in Italy
Former populated places in Italy
Archaeological sites in Molise

es:Venafrum